The Gulf of Saint-Malo is a part of the south-western English Channel between Brittany, Normandy, and the Channel Islands.

Formed by subsidence and flooding of a continental zone of about 8 500 km2, it extends from the Bréhat archipelago in the west to Guernsey and Alderney in the north and to the west coast of Cotentin (Normandy) in the east.

Geography

Islands 
In addition to Bréhat and its archipelago, the Channel Islands Jersey and Guernsey (and the latter's dependencies Alderney and Sark), the Chausey archipelago is situated in the centre.

Towns 
From west to north-east:
 Saint-Brieuc
 Dinard
 Saint-Malo
 Le Mont-Saint-Michel
 Granville
 Barneville-Carteret
 Les Pieux
 Saint-Hélier (capital of Jersey) 
 Saint Peter Port (capital of Guernsey)

Rivers 
Several rivers flow into the Gulf of Saint Malo: the Rance estuary is between Dinard et Saint-Malo ; the  Sélune and the Sée form a common estuary in the Bay of Mont-Saint-Michel ; the Couesnon enters the sea in by Mont-Saint-Michel. The mouths of the Thar, the Sienne and the Gerfleur are on the Cotentin coast.

Environment

References
 

English Channel
Geography of the Channel Islands
Gulfs of Metropolitan France
Landforms of Brittany